Watson Pond is a small freshwater lake within Watson Pond State Park, in Taunton, Massachusetts, United States. The lake is connected to Lake Sabbatia and much of its coastline is forested. The lake is open to the public for swimming and ice fishing.

Since 1991 the Watson Pond has been listed as part of the Canoe River Aquifer Area of Critical Environmental Concern by the Commonwealth of Massachusetts.

See also 
Massasoit State Park
Mill River
Taunton, Massachusetts
Taunton River

References

External links 
City of Taunton's Home Page
City of Taunton's Water Department's Home Page
Massasoit State Park
Taunton River Watershed Alliance

Greater Taunton Area
Taunton, Massachusetts
Taunton River watershed
Lakes of Bristol County, Massachusetts
Reservoirs in Massachusetts